Walid Khalidi (born 1925) is a Palestinian historian who has written extensively on the Palestinian exodus. He is a co-founder of the Institute for Palestine Studies, established in Beirut in December 1963 as an independent research and publishing center focusing on the Palestine problem and the Arab–Israeli conflict, and was its General Secretary until 2016.

Khalidi's first teaching post was at Oxford, a position he resigned from in 1956 in protest at the British invasion of Suez. He was Professor of Political Studies at the American University of Beirut until 1982 and thereafter a research fellow at the Harvard Center for International Affairs. He has also taught at Princeton University.

He is a Fellow of the American Academy of Arts and Sciences. He has been influential in scholarship, institutional development and diplomacy. His academic work in particular, according to Rashid Khalidi, has played a key role in shaping both Palestinian and broader Arab reactions to the loss of Palestine, and in outlining ways for the former to ensure that they remain visible as a presence within the Middle East map.

Life and career
Khalidi was born, one of five children, in Jerusalem. His father, Ahmad Samih Khalidi, was dean of the Arab College of Jerusalem, and hailed from a family with roots in pre-Crusader Palestine. His step mother, Anbara Salam Khalidi (4 August 1897–May 1986), was a Lebanese feminist, translator and author, who significantly contributed to the emancipation of Arab women. Khalidi's early tutor was the director of Education in Palestine, G. B. Farrell. His half-brothers are the  historian Tarif Khalidi and biochemist Usama al-Khalidi.

Khalidi graduated with a B.A. from the University of London in 1945, then studied at the University of Oxford, gaining an M.Litt. in 1951. He then taught at the Faculty of Oriental Studies in Oxford, until he resigned, after the trilateral British, French and Israeli assault on Egypt in 1956, to take up teaching at the American University of Beirut. In the 50s he wrote 2 essays on Abd al-Ghani al-Nabulsi, a Syrian Sufi scholar who had written on tolerance, and who practiced this in regard to Jews and Christians he encountered.

Under his guidance the Institute of Palestine Studies, established in 1963, produced a long series of monographs in English and Arabic and several important translations of Hebrew texts into Arabic: 'The History of the Haganah', David Ben-Gurion and Shertok's diaries—texts that still await translation into English. He has also produced ground-breaking work on the fall of Haifa and Deir Yassin. His best known works are Before Their Diaspora, a photographic essay on Palestinian society prior to 1948 and All That Remains, the encyclopedic collection of village histories which he edited. He became a senior research associate at the Institute of Middle Eastern Studies at Harvard in 1982. More broadly, his intellectual interests extend from modern European history to international relations, in strategic and military terms.

Khalidi was critical of the Palestinian involvement in the Lebanese Civil War, recalling an argument with Yasser Arafat in which he told the Palestinian leader that the PLO "had no business" taking sides in the conflict.

Position on the Palestine question
Khalidi's stated position on the Palestine question is for a two-state solution. In Foreign Affairs: "A Palestinian state in the occupied territories within the 1967 frontiers in peaceful coexistence alongside Israel is the only conceptual candidate for a historical compromise of this century-old conflict. Without it the conflict will remain an open-ended one."

Khalidi was a Palestinian representative to the Joint Palestinian–Jordanian delegation to the Middle East peace talks launched at the Madrid Conference, prior to the Oslo Agreements. He holds no office in the Palestine Liberation Organization (PLO) or any of its bodies.

Awards
At the Palestinian Heritage Foundation's 15th Anniversary banquet, Khalidi was presented with an award for his commitment to the Palestinian cause, the Arab-American community, and the Arab nation.

Reviews

Moshe Brawer, professor of geography at Tel Aviv University wrote that Khalidi's encyclopedic work All that Remains suffers from "inadequate field research." Brawer criticized Khalidi's over-reliance on a modified version of the Village Statistics, which Khalidi acknowledged provide only rough estimates, while not making use of other sources such as the Village Files or RAF aerial photographs which would have yielded more accurate estimates.

Ann M. Lesch of Villanova University wrote that "As scholarly documentation, All That Remains will become the definitive source for research into the Palestinian displacement in 1948."

Published works
(1959) Why Did the Palestinians Leave? Middle East Forum, 24, 21–24, (July 1959). Reprinted as 'Why Did the Palestinians Leave Revisited', 2005, Journal of Palestine Studies, XXXIV, No. 2, 42–54.
(1959) The Fall of Haifa. Middle East Forum, 35, 22–32, (December 1959).
(1961) Plan Dalet: The Zionist Master Plan for the Conquest of Palestine. jstor, Middle East Forum, 37(9), 22–28, (November 1961).

(1974) Palestine and the Arab-Israeli Conflict: An Annotated Bibliography. Institute for Palestine Studies.
(1978) Thinking the unthinkable: A sovereign Palestinian State. Foreign Affairs, 56(4), 695–713.
(1981) Regiopolitics: Toward a U.S. Policy on the Palestine Problem. Foreign Affairs.
(1983) Conflict and Violence in Lebanon: Confrontation in the Middle East. Harvard University Press. 
(1984) Before Their Diaspora: A Photographic History of the Palestinians, 1876–1948. Institute for Palestine Studies. 
(1985) A Palestinian Perspective on the Arab–Israeli Conflict. Journal of Palestine Studies, 14(4) (Summer, 1985), pp. 35–48.
 (1987) From Haven to Conquest: Readings in Zionism and the Palestine Problem until 1948.. Institute of Palestine Studies, Washington DC.
(1988) Toward Peace in the Holy Land. Foreign Affairs
(1989) At a Critical Juncture: The United States and the Palestinian People. Center for Contemporary Arab Studies, Georgetown University.
(1991) The Gulf Crisis: Origins and Consequences. Journal of Palestine Studies, 20(2) (Winter, 1991), pp. 5–28.
(1992) All That Remains: The Palestinian Villages Occupied and Depopulated by Israel in 1948. Institute for Palestine Studies. 
(1992) Palestine Reborn. I. B. Tauris. 
(1993) Benny Morris and Before Their Diaspora. Journal of Palestine Studies, 22(3) (Spring, 1993), pp. 106–119.
(1993) The Jewish-Ottoman Land Company: Herzl's Blueprint for the Colonization of Palestine. Journal of Palestine Studies, 22(2) (Winter, 1993), pp. 30–47.
(1996) Islam, the West and Jerusalem. Center for Contemporary Arab Studies & Center for Muslim–Christian Understanding, Georgetown University.
(1996) Revisiting the UNGA Partition Resolution. Journal of Palestine Studies, 27(1) (Autumn, 1997), pp. 5–21.
 (1998) Khamsuna 'aman a'la taqsim Filastin. Fifty years since the Partition of Palestine (1947–1997), Dar al-Nahar, Beirut. (Arabic).
(1998) Selected Documents on the 1948 Palestine War. Journal of Palestine Studies. 27(3), 79.
(1999)  Dayr Yasin: al-Jum'a, 9 April 1948. Dayr Yasin: Friday, 9 April 1948. Institute for Palestine Studies. Beirut. (Arabic).
(2000) The Ownership of the U.S. Embassy Site in Jerusalem. Institute for Palestine Studies. 
(2005) "On Albert Hourani, the Arab Office, and the Anglo-American Committee of Inquiry 1946", Journal of Palestine Studies vol 35, no. 1 (autumn 2005): 60–79
(2014) "Palestine and Palestine Studies: One Century after World War I and the Balfour Declaration." Center of Palestine Studies, SOAS, University of London First Annual Lecture, 6 March 2014

See also
 Depopulated Palestinian locations in Israel

References

Notes
 Hirsch, Moshe and Housen-Couriel, Deborah (1995). Whither Jerusalem?: Proposals and Positions Concerning the Future of Jerusalem. Martinus Nijhoff Publishers.

External links
 Journal of Palestine Studies, Institute for Palestinian Studies
 Vol 18 no. 1, (Aut. 88): pp. 51–70. Erskine Childers, Walid Khalidi, and Jon Kimche 1961 Correspondence in The Spectator on "Why the Refugees Left" [Originally Appendix E of Khalidi, Walid, "Plan Dalet Revisited: Master Plan for the Conquest of Palestine".
 Journal of Palestine Studies Vol 134, no. 2 (Win. 05): pp. 42–54. Khalidi, Walid "Why did the Palestinians Leave, Revisited".
   Journal of Palestine Studies Vol 21, no. 1 (Aut. 91): pp. 5–16. Khalidi, Walid "The Palestine Problem: An Overview".
 Journal of Palestine Studies Vol 27, no. 3 (Spring, 98): pp. 60–105. Khalidi, Walid "Selected Documents on the 1948 Palestine War".
 Journal of Palestine Studies Vol 35, no. 1 (Autumn 2005): pp. 60–79. Khalidi, Walid "On Albert Hourani, the Arab Office, and the Anglo-American Committee of 1946".
 Journal of Palestine Studies Vol 27, no. 1 (Aut. 1997): pp. 5–21. Khalidi, Walid "Revisiting the 1947 UN Partition Resolution".
 Journal of Palestine Studies Vol 22 no. 3 (Spring 93): 106–119. Khalidi, Walid "Benny Morris and Before their Diaspora".
 Journal of Palestine Studies Vol 2 no. 2 (Win. 73): 3–32 Nasser's Memoirs of the First Palestine War Author(s): Gamal Abdul Nasser and Walid Khalidi
 Walid Khalidi, 2014.

Khalidi family
1925 births
Living people
People from Jerusalem
20th-century Palestinian historians
Harvard Fellows
Princeton University faculty
Alumni of the University of Oxford
Alumni of the University of London
Academic staff of the American University of Beirut
Fellows of the American Academy of Arts and Sciences
Palestinian political writers
Palestinianists
Palestine ethnographers
21st-century Palestinian historians